Hell of A Week with Charlamagne tha God (formerly Tha God's Honest Truth) is a late-night talk show and variety series hosted by Lenard "Charlamagne tha God" McKelvey. It airs on Comedy Central since September 2021 and is executive produced by Charlamagne and The Late Show host Stephen Colbert.

Production 
The first season of the series was titled Tha God's Honest Truth with Lenard ‘Charlamagne’ McKelvey; Charlamagne stated that the program would carry influence from its timeslot competitor on HBO, Real Time with Bill Maher, along with Jon Stewart's incarnation of The Daily Show, arguing that he had "always appreciated shows that could put the medicine in the candy". Stephen Colbert and The Boondocks creator Aaron McGruder are also involved in the series, with Charlamagne acknowledging his past work with Colbert and his ability to present current affairs in a comedic fashion, and arguing that cartoonists were "literally able to predict the future".

Charlamagne also specifically requested that he be billed by his real name, explaining that it "snaps me back into reality and it just keeps me from being a caricature of myself."

In its first season, the series largely featured "deep dives" into social issues, including those affecting younger demographics and African-Americans, and interviews with notable figures such as politicians. In July 2022, it was announced that the show would be reformatted for its second season beginning July 28, retitled Hell of A Week with Charlamagne tha God, and switching to a panel discussion format; he cited that there were already enough programs discussing "problems", and that he wanted to "discuss solutions".

Episodes

References

External links
 Comedy Central homepage for Hell of A Week
 Comedy Central homepage for Tha God’s Honest Truth

2021 American television series debuts
2020s American late-night television series
Comedy Central original programming
Comedy Central late-night programming
Stephen Colbert